This is a list of Black American authors and writers, all of whom are considered part of African-American literature, and who already have Wikipedia articles. The list also includes non-American authors resident in the US and American writers of African descent.

A

 Aberjhani (born 1957), historian, columnist, novelist, poet, artist and editor
 Mumia Abu-Jamal (born 1954), political activist and journalist
 Linda Addison (born 1952), author and poet
 Tomi Adeyemi (born 1993), author and creative writing coach
 Ai, aka Ai Ogawa, birth name Florence Anthony (1947-2010), poet, NBA for poetry, 1999. 
 Rochelle Alers (born 1943), author and artist
 Elizabeth Alexander (born 1962), poet, essayist and playwright
 Kwame Alexander (born 1968), writer of poetry and children's fiction
 Larry D. Alexander (born 1953), author and artist
 Lewis Grandison Alexander (1898–1945)
 Candace Allen (living), novelist, cultural critic and screenwriter
 Clarissa Minnie Thompson Allen (1859–1941), author and educator
 Robert L. Allen (born 1942), activist, writer and academic
 Garland Anderson (1886–1939), playwright
 Maya Angelou (1928–2014), author and poet
 Tina McElroy Ansa (born 1949), novelist, filmmaker, teacher and journalist
 Ray Aranha (1939–2011), actor, playwright and stage director
 Chalmers Archer (1928–2014), author, veteran and educator
 M. K. Asante, Jr. (born 1982), author, poet, screenwriter, professor
 Jabari Asim (born 1962), poet, playwright, professor
 Russell Atkins (born 1926), musician, playwright and poet
 William Attaway (1911–1986), novelist, short-story writer, essayist, songwriter, playwright and screenwriter

B

 Calvin Baker (born 1972), novelist
 James Baldwin (1924–1987), novelist, playwright, essayist, poet and activist
 Toni Cade Bambara (1939–1995)
 Leslie Esdaile Banks (1959–2011)
 Amiri Baraka (1934–2014)
 Shauna Barbosa (born c. 1988), poet
 Steven Barnes (born 1952)
 Lindon W. Barrett (1961–2008)
 Samuel Alfred Beadle (1857–1932)
 Paul Beatty (born 1962)
 Robert Beck (1918–1992)
 Christopher C. Bell (born 1933)
 Derrick Bell (1930–2011)
 Brit Bennett (living)
 Gwendolyn Bennett (1902–1981)
 Hal Bennett (1936–2004)
 Lerone Bennett, Jr. (1928–2018)
 Bertice Berry (born 1960)
 Venise T. Berry (living), novelist
 Henry Bibb (1815–1854)
 Eleanor Taylor Bland (1944–2010), writer of crime fiction
 Marita Bonner (1899–1971)
 Arna Bontemps (1902–1973)
 James Boggs (1919–1993)
 Demico Boothe (living), writer on civil rights
 David Bradley (born 1950)
 William Stanley Braithwaite (1878–1962), poet and literary critic
 Gwendolyn Brooks (1917–2000)
 Claude Brown (1937–2002)
 Hallie Quinn Brown (1849–1949)
 Roseanne A. Brown (born 1995)
 Sterling A. Brown (1901–1989), poet, literary critic, professor, poet laureate of the District of Columbia
 William Wells Brown (1814–1884), wrote first novel published by an African American, Clotel (1853)
 Anatole Broyard (1920-1990)
 Ashley Bryan (1923–2022)
 Niobia Bryant (born 1972), author of romance and mainstream fiction novels
 Ed Bullins (1935–2021)
 Olivia Ward Bush (1869–1944)
 Octavia Butler (1947–2006)
 Roderick D. Bush (1945–2013)

C
 George Cain (1943–2010)
 Bebe Moore Campbell (1950–2006)
 Stokely Carmichael (1941–1998)
 Ben Carson (born 1951)
 Jennie Carter (1830–1881)
 Stephen L. Carter (born 1954)
 Cyrus Cassells (born 1957)
 Lady Chablis (1957–2016), actress, author, drag performer
 Charles W. Chesnutt (1858–1932), novelist and short-story writer
 Alice Childress (1916–1994), playwright and novelist
 Breena Clarke (living)
 Cheril N. Clarke (born 1980)
 Cheryl Clarke (born 1947)
 John Henrik Clarke (1915–1998)
 Stanley Bennett Clay (born 1950), writer, director, actor, publisher
 Troy CLE (living)
 Pearl Cleage (born 1948)
 Eldridge Cleaver (1935–1998)
 Michelle Cliff (1946–2016)
 Lucille Clifton (1936–2010)
 Wendy Coakley-Thompson (born 1966)
 Ta-Nehisi Coates (born 1975)
 Wanda Coleman (1946–2013)
 Marvel Cooke (1903–2000)
 Anna J. Cooper (1858–1964)
 J. California Cooper (1931–2014), playwright
 James Corrothers (1869–1917)
 Jayne Cortez (1934–2012)
 Bill Cosby (born 1937)
 Joseph Seamon Cotter, Sr. (1861–1949)
 Donald Crews (born 1938), children's book author
 Stanley Crouch (1945–2020)
 Harold Cruse (1916–2005)
 Countee Cullen (1903–1946)
 Waring Cuney (1906–1976)
 Christopher Paul Curtis (born 1953)

D

 Jeffrey Daniels (living), poet
 Meri Nana-Ama Danquah (born 1967)
 Christopher Darden (born 1956)
 Angela Davis (born 1944) political activist, writer, and professor.
 Frank Marshall Davis (1905–1987)
 Kyra Davis (born 1972), novelist
 Milton Davis (living)
 George Dawson (1898–2001)
 Samuel R. Delany (born 1942), novelist
 Eric Jerome Dickey (1961–2021)
 Anita Doreen Diggs (born 1966)
 Lonnie Dixon (1932–2011)
 Frederick Douglass (1818–1895)
 Rita Dove (born 1952), poet and educator. Youngest person and first Black American to be the U.S. Poet Laureate and Consultant in Poetry at the Library of Congress.
 Sharon Draper (born 1948)
 W. E. B. Du Bois (1868–1963) writer, Sociologist, and activist. Du Bois was a founding member of the NAACP. His most notable work is The Souls of Black Folk.
 Tananarive Due (born 1966) writer specializing in Black speculative fiction, and professor of Black Horror and Afrofuturism.
 Henry Dumas (1934–1968)
 Paul Laurence Dunbar (1872–1906), poet
 Alice Dunbar-Nelson (1875–1935)
 David Anthony Durham (born 1969)
 Richard Durham, (1917–1984), wrote radio series Destination Freedom
 Michael Eric Dyson (born 1958)

E

 Cornelius Eady (born 1954)
 Sarah Jane Woodson Early (1825–1907), educator, activist and author
 Junius Edwards (1929–2008)
 Ralph Ellison (1913–1994), novelist, best known as author of Invisible Man
 Olaudah Equiano (c. 1745–1797)
 Don Evans (1938–2003), playwright
 Mari Evans (1919–2017), poet
 Percival Everett (born 1956)
 Eve Ewing (born 1986) author, educator, poet, and Sociologist.

F
 Sarah Webster Fabio (1928–1979)
 Ronald Fair (1932–2018)
 Sarah Farro, 19th-century novelist
 John M. Faucette (1943–2003), science-fiction author
 Arthur Huff Fauset (1899–1983)
 Jessie Fauset (1882–1961), editor, poet, essayist and novelist
 London R. Ferebee (1849–1883), preacher and author
 Lolita Files (living), author, screenwriter and producer
 Antwone Fisher (born 1959)
 Rudolph Fisher (1897–1934), novelist, short story writer and dramatist
 Sharon G. Flake (born 1955), writer of young adult literature
 Robert Fleming (living), journalist and writer of erotic fiction and horror fiction
 Mary Weston Fordham (c.1862–1905), poet
 Namina Forna (born 1987), author and screen writer
 Leon Forrest (1937–1997), novelist
 Tonya Foster (living), poet, essayist and educator
 J. E. Franklin (born 1937), playwright
 John Hope Franklin (1915-2009), historian, sociologist, memoirist
 Hoyt W. Fuller (1923–1981)
 Nina Foxx (living), novelist, playwright and screenwriter

G
 Ernest Gaines (1933–2019), fiction writer
 Ruth Gaines-Shelton (1872–1938), educator and playwright
 Marcus Garvey (1887–1940)
 Tony Gaskins (born 1984), motivational, inspirational, self-help writer
 Henry Louis Gates, Jr. (born 1950)
 Roxane Gay (born 1974)
 Nikki Giovanni (born 1943)
 Roy Glenn (1914–1971), fiction writer, Is It A Crime, Payback
 Donald Goines (1936–1974)
 Marita Golden (born 1950)
 Edythe Mae Gordon (ca. 1897–1980), poet, fiction writer
 Eugene Gordon (1891–1972), journalist
 Charles Gordone (1925–1995), playwright
 Amanda Gorman (born 1998), poet
 Lawrence Otis Graham (born 1962)
 Moses Grandy (born c. 1786)
 Victor Hugo Green (1892–1960), travel writer
 Eloise Greenfield (1929–2021), children's book author
 Sam Greenlee (1930–2014), novelist, poet, best known as author of The Spook Who Sat by the Door
 Bonnie Greer (born 1948), novelist, playwright, critic
 Deborah Gregory, author of The Cheetah Girls book series
 Dick Gregory (1932–2017)
 Sutton E. Griggs (1872–1933)
 Nikki Grimes (born 1950), children's book author and poet
 Angelina Weld Grimke (1880–1958)
 Charlotte Forten Grimké (1837–1914)
 Rosa Guy (1922–2012)
 John Langston Gwaltney (1928–1998), anthropologist, author of Drylongso
 Yaa Gyasi (born 1989), Ghanaian-American novelist, author of Homegoing.

H

 Alex Haley (1921–1992), author of Roots: The Saga of an American Family
 Virginia Hamilton (1934–2002), author of children's books
 Henry Hampton (1940–1998)
 Lorraine Hansberry (1930–1965), playwright
 Joyce Hansen (born 1942), author of children's books
 Vincent Harding (1931–2014), historian and social activist
 Edward W. Hardy (born 1992), playwright
 Nathan Hare (born 1933)
 Frances Harper (1825–1911), poet and abolitionist
 E. Lynn Harris (1955–2009)
 Juanita Harrison (1891–?)
 Saidiya Hartman (born 1961) writer and academic, known for her seminal work Scenes of Subjection.
 Robert Hayden (1913–1980), poet, essayist, educator
 Essex Hemphill (1957–1995), poet and activist
 David Henderson (poet) (born 1942)
 Safiya Henderson-Holmes (1950–2001), poet
 Chester Himes (1909–1984), novelist
 Kameisha Jerae Hodge (born 1989)
 Corey J. Hodges (born 1970)
 Karla F. C. Holloway (born 1949)
 bell hooks (1952—2021), feminist, and social activist
 Pauline Hopkins (1859–1930), novelist, journalist, playwright, historian and editor
 Nalo Hopkinson (born 1960), Jamaican Canadian, currently based in California
 George Moses Horton (1798–after 1867)
 Detrick Hughes (born 1966)
 Langston Hughes (1901–1967), poet, social activist, novelist, playwright and columnist
 Zora Neale Hurston (1891–1960), folklorist, anthropologist, author of novels short stories, plays and essays

I
 Jordan Ifueko (born 1993), writer
 Rashidah Ismaili (born 1941), poet, fiction writer, essayist and playwright

J
 Brenda Jackson (born 1953)
 Jesse C. Jackson (1908–1983), young-adult novelist
 Harriet Jacobs (1813 or 1815–1897), author of Incidents in the Life of a Slave Girl (1861)
 T. D. Jakes (born 1957)
 Ayize Jama-Everett (born 1974), science fiction and speculative fiction writer
 John Jea (1773–after 1817)
 N. K. Jemisin (born 1972), writer of speculative fiction. First person to win three consecutive Hugo Awards for Best Novel.
 Beverly Jenkins (born 1951)
 Joseph Jewell (living)
 Terri L. Jewell (1954–1995), poet, writer and Black lesbian activist
 Alaya Dawn Johnson (born 1982)
 Angela Johnson (born 1961)
 Charles R. Johnson (born 1948)
 Georgia Douglas Johnson (1880–1966), poet
 Helene Johnson (1906–1995), poet
 James Weldon Johnson (1871–1938)
 Mat Johnson (born 1970)
 Varian Johnson (born 1977)
 Edward P. Jones (born 1950), novelist and short-story writer
 Gayl Jones (born 1949), novelist
 Tayari Jones (born 1970)
 June Jordan (1936–2002), poet, essayist and activist

K

 Ron Karenga (born 1941)
 Bob Kaufman (1925–1986), poet
 Elizabeth Keckley (1818–1907)
 William Melvin Kelley (1937–2017), novelist
 Emma Dunham Kelley-Hawkins (1863–1938), novelist
 Randall Kenan (1963–2020)
 Adrienne Kennedy (born 1931), playwright
 Nina Kennedy (born 1960), memoirist, screenwriter
 John Oliver Killens (1916–1987), novelist
 Jamaica Kincaid (born 1949)
 Martin Luther King Jr. (1929–1968)
 Woodie King Jr. (born 1937)
 Etheridge Knight (1931–1991), poet
 Yusef Komunyakaa (born 1941)

L
 Pinkie Gordon Lane (1923–2008), poet, editor and teacher
 Nella Larsen (1891–1964), novelist
 Victor LaValle (born 1972)
 Andrea Lee, novelist and memoirist
 Julius Lester (1939–2018)
 David Levering Lewis (born 1936)
 Willie Little (born 1961) author, multimedia artist
 Alain Locke (1885–1954)
 Attica Locke (born 1974), novelist
 Audre Lorde (1934–1992), author, poet, activist
 Bettina L. Love, abolitionist educator and writer
 Glenville Lovell (born 1955), novelist and playwright

M

 Christopher Mwashinga (born 1965), poet, theologian, essayist
 Nathaniel Mackey (born 1947), poet, novelist, anthologist, literary critic and editor
 Naomi Long Madgett (1923–2020), poet
 Haki R. Madhubuti (born 1942)
 Clarence Major (born 1936), poet, painter and novelist
 Raynetta Manees (living), novelist
 Manning Marable (1950–2011)
 John Marrant (1755–1791)
 Paule Marshall (1929–2019)
 Ora Mae Lewis Martin (1889–1977), journalist and writer
 Hans Massaquoi (1926–2013)
 Brandon Massey (born 1973)
 Victoria Earle Matthews (1861–1907), essayist, newspaperwoman, activist
 Julian Mayfield (1928–1984)
 James McBride (writer) (born 1957)
 Nathan McCall (born 1955)
 Bernice McFadden (born 1965), novelist
 Claude McKay (1889–1948)
 Patricia McKissack (1944–2017)
 Reginald McKnight (born 1956)
 Kim McLarin (born 1964), novelist
 Terry McMillan (born 1951), novelist
 James Alan McPherson (1943–2016)
 Louise Meriwether (born 1923), novelist, essayist, journalist and activist
 Oscar Micheaux (1884–1951)
 E. Ethelbert Miller (born 1950), poet
 May Miller (1899–1995), poet and playwright
 Arthenia J. Bates Millican (1920–2012), poet, essayist and educator
 Mary Monroe (living), novelist
 Anne Moody (1940–2015)
 Jessica Care Moore (born 1971), poet
 Toni Morrison (1931–2019), author, Nobel laureate 1993
 E. Frederic Morrow (c.1909–1994), first black American appointed to a president's administration (1955–60)
 Walter Mosley (born 1952), novelist
 Thylias Moss (born 1954)
 Willard Motley (1909–1965)
 Jess Mowry (born 1960)
 Albert Murray (1916–2013)
 Pauli Murray (1910–1985)
 Walter Dean Myers (1937–2014), writer of children's books

N
 Tariq Nasheed (living)
 Gloria Naylor (1950–2016)
 Larry Neal (1937–1981)
 Barbara Neely (1941–2020), novelist, short-story writer and activist
 Huey P. Newton (1942–1989)
 Richard Bruce Nugent (1906–1987)

O

 Mwatabu S. Okantah (born 1952) poet and professor.
 Gabriel Okara (1921–2019)
 Nnedi Okorafor (born 1974)
 Marc Olden (1933–2003)
 Porsha Olayiwola (living)
 Terry a. O'Neal (born 1973)
 Tochi Onyebuchi (born 1987)
 Roscoe Orman (born 1944)
 Ewuare Osayande (living)
 Brenda Marie Osbey (born 1957), poet
 Candace Owens (born 1989), political activist

P
 ZZ Packer (born 1973)
 Gordon Parks (1912–2006)
 Suzan-Lori Parks (born 1963), playwright, screenwriter, musician and novelist
 Tyler Perry (born 1969)
 Eric Pete (living), novelist and short-story writer
 Ann Petry (1908–1997), writer of novels, short stories, children's books and journalism
 Debra Phillips (born 1959)
 Delores Phillips (1950–2014), poet and novelist
 Steve Phillips (born 1964), author, columnist, political thought leader
 William Pickens (1881–1954)
 Ann Plato (born c. 1824), educator and author
 Sterling Plumpp (born 1940), educator and author
 Carlene Hatcher Polite (1932–2009)
 Alvin F. Poussaint (born 1934)
 Jewel Prestage (1931–2014), first African-American woman to earn a Ph.D. in political science, former Dean of the School of Public Policy and Urban Affairs at Southern University.
 Robert Earl Price (born 1942), playwright and poet

R
 Aishah Rahman (1936–2014), playwright
 Alice Randall (born 1959), author and songwriter
 Dudley Randall (1914–2000), poet and publisher
 Cordelia Ray (1852–1916), poet and teacher
 Francis Ray (1944–2013), writer of romance fiction
 Andy Razaf (1895–1973), poet, composer and lyricist
 Ishmael Reed (born 1938), poet, essayist and novelist
 Kiley Reid (born 1987), novelist
 Jason Reynolds (born 1983), YA/Middle-Grade novelist/poet
 Willis Richardson (1889–1977), playwright
 Florida Ruffin Ridley (1861–1943), essayist and short story writer
 Harrison David Rivers (born 1981), playwright
 Cliff Roquemore (1948–2002), writer, producer and director
 Carolyn Rodgers (1940–2010), poet
 Octavia V. Rogers Albert (1853–c.1890)
 Al Roker (born 1954)
 Fran Ross (1935–1985)
 Josephine St. Pierre Ruffin (1842–1924), journalist
 Malinda Russell (ca. 1812–?), author of the first known cookbook by a Black woman in the United States
 Rachel Renee Russell, author of the Dork Diaries series of children's novels
 Carl Hancock Rux, poet, essayist, playwright, novelist
 Rupaul (born 1960), actor, author, drag performer, TV show host

S
 Kalamu ya Salaam (born 1947), poet, author, filmmaker, teacher, activist
 Sonia Sanchez (born 1934), poet
 Dori Sanders (born 1934) novelist
 Sapphire (born 1950)
 Charles R. Saunders (1946–2020), author and journalist
 Arturo Alfonso Schomburg (1874–1938), historian, writer, and activist
 George Schuyler (1895–1977), author, journalist and social commentator
 Gil Scott-Heron (1949–2011), poet and musician
 Clara Johnson Scroggins (1931–2019), author, collector
 Sandra Seaton (living), playwright and librettist
 Victor Séjour (1817–1874)
 Fatima Shaik (living), author
 Tupac Shakur (1971–1996)
 Ntozake Shange (1948–2018), playwright and poet
 Nisi Shawl (born 1955)
 Sister Souljah (born 1964)
 Iceberg Slim (1918–1992)
 Amanda Smith (1837–1915)
 Danez Smith (living), poet
 Effie Waller Smith (1879–1960), poet
 William Gardner Smith (1927–1974), journalist, novelist, and editor
 Thomas Sowell (born 1930), economist, social theorist, political philosopher
 A. B. Spellman (born 1935)
 Anne Spencer (1882–1975), poet
 Aurin Squire (born 1979), producer, playwright, screenwriter and reporter
 Theophilus Gould Steward (1843–1924)
 Maria W. Stewart (1803–1879), journalist, lecturer, abolitionist, women's rights activist
 Jeffrey C. Stewart (born 1950), professor and Pulitzer prize winner
 Nic Stone (born 1985)

T
 Ellen Tarry (1906–2008)
 Mildred D. Taylor (born 1943)
 Susie Taylor (1848–1912)
 Mary Church Terrell (1863–1954)
 Lucy Terry (c. 1730–1821)
 Michael Thelwell (born 1939)
 Angie Thomas (born 1988)
 Clarence Thomas (born 1948)
 Joyce Carol Thomas (1938–2016), author, poet, playwright, and motivational speaker
 Lorenzo Thomas (1944–2005)
 Piri Thomas (1928–2011)
 Truth Thomas (living)
 Pamela Thomas-Graham (born 1963)
 Era Bell Thompson (1905–1986)
 Howard Thurman (1899–1981)
 Wallace Thurman (1902–1934)
 Ruth D. Todd (1878–?)
 Lynn Toler (born 1959)
 Melvin B. Tolson (1898–1966)
 Jean Toomer (1894–1967)
 Touré (born 1971)
 Askia M. Touré (born 1938), poet, essayist, leading voice of the Black Arts Movement
 Quincy Troupe (born 1939)
 Sojourner Truth (c.1797–1883)
 Omar Tyree (born 1969)
 Neil deGrasse Tyson (born 1958)

V
 Henry Van Dyke (1928–2011), novelist, editor, teacher and musician
 Ivan Van Sertima (1935–2009), professor, author, historian, linguist and anthropologist at Rutgers University
 Bethany Veney (c. 1813–1916), author of Aunt Betty's Story: The Narrative of Bethany Veney, A Slave Woman (1889)
 Olympia Vernon (born 1973), novelist

W
 Dwyane Wade (born 1982)
 Alice Walker (born 1944)
 Frank X. Walker (born 1961), founding member of Affrilachian poets
 Margaret Walker (1915–1998)
 Christopher George Latore Wallace (1972–1997)
 Michele Wallace (born 1952)
 Eric Walrond (1898–1966)
 Mildred Pitts Walter (born 1922)
 Marilyn Nelson Waniek (born 1946)
 Douglas Turner Ward (1930–2021)
 Jesmyn Ward (born 1977)
 Booker T. Washington (1856–1915)
 Frank J. Webb (1828–c.1894), novelist, poet, essayist
 Ida B. Wells (1862–1931)
 Richard Wesley (born 1945), playwright, screenwriter
 Valerie Wilson Wesley (born 1947)
 Cornel West (born 1953)
 Dorothy West (1907–1998), novelist
 Phillis Wheatley (1753–1784), first published African-American poet
 Walter Francis White (1893–1955)
 Colson Whitehead (born 1969), novelist (The Intuitionist, The Underground Railroad) and journalist
 Steven Whitehurst (born 1967), award-winning author
 Albery Allson Whitman (1851–1901), poet, minister and orator
 Anthony Whyte, writer of urban and hip-hop literature
 John Edgar Wideman (born 1941)
 Isabel Wilkerson (born 1961)
 Crystal Wilkinson (living)
 Chancellor Williams (1893–1992), historian and sociologist
 John Alfred Williams (1925–2015), author, journalist and academic
 Samm-Art Williams (born 1946), playwright
 Sherley Anne Williams (1944–1999)
 Walter E. Williams (1936–2020)
 August Wilson (1945–2005)
 Harriet E. Wilson (1825–1900), author of Our Nig and the first African-American novelist
 William Julius Wilson (born 1935), author of When Work Disappears, The Truly Disadvantaged, and The Declining Significance of Race
 Oprah Winfrey (born 1954)
 Carter G. Woodson (1875–1950)
 Jacqueline Woodson (born 1963), award-winning author of books for children and adolescents, including "Brown Girl Dreaming"
 David Wright (born 1964)
 Jay Wright (born 1935), poet
 Kelly Wright, author of Outed Obsession and Fatal Fixation
 Richard Wright (1908–1960), writer of novels, short stories, poems and non-fiction

X
 Malcolm X (1925–1965)
 Marian X (born 1944)

Y
 Camille Yarbrough (born 1938)
 Frank Yerby (1916–1991), historical novelist
 Al Young (1939–2021), poet, novelist, essayist, screenwriter and professor

Z
 Zane (born 1966/67), author of erotic fiction
 Ahmos Zu-Bolton (1948–2005), activist, poet and playwright

See also

 List of African-American nonfiction writers
 List of Black New York Times Best Selling Authors
 African-American literature
 Lists of writers
 Multi-Ethnic Literature of the United States
 Before Columbus Foundation
 List of Mexican-American writers

References

Writers
African-American